One Piece is an anime series based on the manga series of the same name written by Eiichiro Oda. Produced by Toei Animation, and directed by Konosuke Uda, Munehisa Sakai, and Hiroaki Miyamoto, it began broadcasting on Fuji Television on October 20, 1999. One Piece follows the adventures of Monkey D. Luffy, a 17-year-old boy, whose body has gained the properties of rubber from accidentally eating a supernatural fruit, and his crew of diverse pirates, named the Straw Hat Pirates. Luffy's greatest ambition is to obtain the world's ultimate treasure, One Piece, and thereby become the next King of the Pirates. The series uses 42 different pieces of theme music: 24 opening themes and 18 closing themes. Several CDs that contain the theme music and other tracks have been released by Toei Animation. The first DVD compilation was released on February 21, 2001, with individual volumes releasing monthly. The Singaporean company Odex released part of the series locally in English and Japanese in the form of dual audio Video CDs. 

The first unedited, bilingual DVD box set, containing 13 episodes, was released on May 27, 2008. Similarly sized sets followed with 31 sets released as of July 2015. Episodes began streaming on August 29, 2009.

Episode list

Season 15: Fishman Island (2011–12)

Season 16: Punk Hazard (2013–14)

Season 17: Dressrosa (2014–16)

Season 18: Zou (2016–17)

Season 19: Whole Cake Island (2017–19)

Season 20: Wano Country (2019–present)

Releases

Japanese

DVD/Blu-ray
Season 16 onward, including the Film Z and Film Gold tie-in episodes, were released on both DVD and Blu-ray. The Log Collections were released on DVD only.

English
In Australia, the Season releases were renamed Collection 43 through 48.

Seasons Nine and Ten, and Collections 22 to 25, were released on DVD only. Beginning with Season Eleven, and half of Collection 26, the series began to be released in DVD and Blu-ray combo packs.

Notes

References

Episodes
One Piece episodes